Green state may refer to:
 a state whose government may follow green politics
 a state where a green party is influential
 the idea of green nationalism of a state bound by, and conforming to its ecology
 The Green State, a 2004 book by Robyn Eckersley